Dichanthium, known commonly as bluestem or bluegrass, is a genus of African, Asian, and Australian plants in the grass family.

Some species have become naturalized in the Americas and on various oceanic islands.

Species
Species include:

Former species
Several species formerly included are now regarded as better suited to other genera, including in: Andropogon, Bothriochloa, Capillipedium, Euclasta, and  Pseudodichanthium.

References

External links
 
 
 Dichanthium at Grassbase—The World Online Grass Flora
 USDA Plants Profile for Dichanthium

Andropogoneae
Poaceae genera
Grasses of Africa
Grasses of Asia